The 1998 WNBA season was the second for the Charlotte Sting. The Sting qualified for the playoffs, but they lost in the league semifinals to eventual champion Houston Comets.

Offseason

WNBA Draft

Regular season

Season standings

Season schedule

Playoffs

Player stats

References

External links
Sting on Basketball Reference

Charlotte Sting seasons
Charlotte
Charlotte Sting